Poivre is the French word for pepper. It may also refer to:

 Places
 Poivres, a commune in north-central France.
 Poivre Atoll, atoll of Seychelles
 Steak au poivre, a French dish of steak cooked with peppercorns
 People
 Jacques-François Le Poivre (1652–1710), Belgian mathematician
 Pierre Poivre, French horticulturalist
 Patrick Poivre d'Arvor, French journalist and writer